An Eye for an Eye is a 1966 American Pathécolor Western film directed by Michael D. Moore.  The film was co-scripted by Bing Russell, father of actor Kurt Russell.

Plot

Robert Lansing plays Talion, an ex-bounty hunter turned homesteader who, after his ranch is burned to the ground and his wife and child are murdered, meets up with and hires bounty hunter Benny Wallace (Patrick Wayne, son of John Wayne) to track down the killer, Ike Slant (Slim Pickens). Along the way, they befriend entrepreneur Brian Quince, his daughter Bri Quince (Gloria Talbott) and her brother "Jo-Hi" (Clint Howard).

Brian, mistaking the two bounty hunters for lawmen, provides them with information to help them track down Ike Slant and his accomplices, the Beetson brothers. During an ambush on Ike's camp, Ike shoots Talion's gun hand while Wallace is able to gun down both Beetson brothers. Without Talion's support, Ike is able to deliver a head wound to Wallace before escaping on horseback.

The two wounded bounty hunters are thus forced to rely upon each other, leading them to resolutely combine into one single, unstoppable killing machine. Talion facilitates this by training Wallace, who cannot see but can still shoot straight, to visualize a clock in his head so that Talion can guide his aim using clock numbers as directions.

Wallace, it turns out, is the son of the famous Pat Garrett, who took down Billy the Kid. It is also revealed that Talion killed Slant's younger brother before the movie started and that Ike's slaying of Talion's son and wife were an act of vengeance. During the final shootout, Wallace/Garrett Jr. and Ike Slant are both killed. Despite a developing romantic relationship with Bri, Talion rides off, leaving her behind so that she does not meet the same fate as his late wife.

Cast

 Robert Lansing as Talion
 Pat Wayne as Benny Wallace
 Slim Pickens as Ike Slant
 Gloiria Talbot as Bri Quince
 Paul Fix as Brian Quince
 Strother Martin as Trumbull
 Clint Howard as Jo-Hi Quince - Brian's Son
 Rance Howard as Harry
 Henry Wills as Charley Beetson
 Jerry Gatling as Jones Beetson

See also
 List of American films of 1966

References

External links
 
 

1966 films
1960s English-language films
1966 Western (genre) films
American Western (genre) films
Embassy Pictures films
Films directed by Mickey Moore
Films scored by Raoul Kraushaar
Films about blind people
Revisionist Western (genre) films
1960s American films